The Violent Professionals (Italian: Milano trema: la polizia vuole giustizia) is a 1973 Italian Poliziotteschi gangster film directed by Sergio Martino. The film stars Luc Merenda (Giorgio Caneparo) who goes undercover as a getaway driver for the mob so he can wage a one-man war on crime to avenge the death of father-figure cop Gianni (Silvano Tranquilli).

In 2009 Empire Magazine named it #9 in a poll of the "20 Greatest Gangster Movies You've Never Seen* (*Probably)".

Cast 
 Luc Merenda as Commissioner Giorgio Caneparo
 Richard Conte as Padulo aka Salassolio
 Silvano Tranquilli as Gianni Viviani
 Carlo Alighiero as Commissioner Nicastro
 Martine Brochard as Maria
 Chris Avram as Commissioner Del Buono 
 Lia Tanzi as the prostitute
 Antonio Casale as Casardi 
 Luciano Rossi as Cruciani

Release
The Violent Professionals was released in Italy on August 22, 1973 where it was distributed by Interfilm. It was a box office hit in Italy where it grossed a total of 1,162,424,000 Italian lire.

The film has been released in an English-language friendly DVD by Wild East and as a double feature from Alpha Video with Deadly Drifter.

See also 
 List of Italian films of 1973

Footnotes

References

External links
 
  Film locations in Milan

Films directed by Sergio Martino
Police detective films
1970s crime films
Poliziotteschi films
1973 films
Films set in Milan
Films with screenplays by Ernesto Gastaldi
Films produced by Luciano Martino
1970s Italian films